Dereel is a town in the Western District of the Australian state of Victoria. At the 2016 census, Dereel and the surrounding area had a population of 533.

There is no clearly defined town centre, though the Dereel Soldiers' Memorial Hall, located on Swamp Road, is commonly considered as the town centre.

Dereel Post Office opened on 1 November 1868 and closed in 1971.

Dereel includes a large wetlands area, referred to as the "Swamp" or "Lagoon".  In recent years it is almost dry.

On 27 March 2013, a bushfire at Dereel destroyed 16 houses and 18 sheds. The fire covered .

References

Towns in Victoria (Australia)
Golden Plains Shire